Krempel is a surname.  Notable people with the surname include:

 Erich Krempel (1913–1992), German sport shooter
 Fritz Krempel (1905–1984), German sports shooter
 John Krempel (1861–1933), German-born American architect
 Paul Krempel (1900–1973), American gymnast

Occupational surnames